Claudia (minor planet designation: 311 Claudia) is a typical Main belt asteroid.

It was discovered by Auguste Charlois on 11 June 1891 in Nice. The name was suggested to Charlois by the amateur astronomer Arthur Mee of Cardiff, Wales, to commemorate Mee's wife, Claudia.

311 Claudia is one of the Koronis family of asteroids. A group of astronomers, including Lucy D'Escoffier Crespo da Silva and Richard P. Binzel, used observations made between 1998 through 2000 to determine the spin-vector alignment of these asteroids. The collaborative work resulted in the creation of 61 new individual rotation lightcurves to augment previous published observations.

References

External links 
 
 

000311
Discoveries by Auguste Charlois
Named minor planets
000311
18910611